Vilnius - Klaipėda Railway is one of the main local railways in Lithuania. This railway connect Lithuanian capital Vilnius with countries biggest seaside city Klaipėda.

The train services going from Vilnius to Klaipėda runs 4 times per day.

Stations 
Vilnius railway station
Kaišiadorys railway station
Jonava railway station
Kėdainiai railway station
Radviliškis railway station
Šiauliai railway station
Telšiai railway station
Plungė railway station
Kretinga railway station
Giruliai railway station
Klaipėda railway station

References 

Rail transport in Vilnius
Transport in Klaipėda
Railway lines in Lithuania
1520 mm gauge railways in Lithuania